Ana María del Río (born 1948 in Santiago, Chile) is a Chilean literature professor, feminist writer, and novelist. Her honors include the Santiago Municipal Literature Award and the María Luisa Bombal Award.

Biography
She studied literature at the Pontifical Catholic University of Chile and did graduate work at Rice University and the University of Pittsburgh. Her work has been published in Chile as well as in Spain, Argentina, and the United States.

She made her literary debut in 1985 with her book Entreparéntesis, and one year later she released her first novel, Óxido de Carmen, which deals with the feminine bias prevailing in Latin American women's literature in the 1980s, also visible in Alessandra Luiselli, María Luisa Puga, Elena Poniatowska and Carmen Boullosa's works. and which received the María Luisa Bombal Award.

Works 
 Entreparéntesis (Santiago: Arcilla, 1985).
 Óxido de Carmen (Barcelona: Ediciones del Bronce, 1986, 1988, 1998).
 De golpe, Amalia en el umbral (Santiago: Editorial Andrés Bello, 1991).
 Siete días de la señora K. (Santiago: Editorial Planeta, 1993, 1994, 1995; Buenos Aires: Seix Barral, 1996).
 Tiempo que ladra (Coral Gables, Fla.: University of Miami, North-South Center, c1991; Santiago: Editorial Planeta, 1994). 
 Bajo Techo : Antología de cuentos chilenos contemporáneos (Santiago: El Ministerio, 1995).
 Gato por liebre (Santiago: Caos Eds., 1995).
 A tango abierto (Santiago: Alfaguara, 1996, 1997).
 La esfera media del aire (Santiago: Aguilar Chilena de Ediciones, c1998).
 Carmenoxid (Frankfurt: Frankfurter Verlagsanstalt, 1999).
 Lita, la niña del fin del mundo (Santiago: Aguilar Chilena de Eds., 2003, 2005).
 Ni a tontas ni a locas (Santiago: Aguilar Chilena de Ediciones, 2003)
 Amarilis (Santiago: Aguilar Chilena de Ediciones, 2005, 2006).
 Cuentos chilenos : una antología (Madrid: Eds. Siruela, 2006).
 La bruja bella y el solitario (Santiago: Aguilar Chilena de Eds. 1999, 2000, 2001, 2002, 2003, 2004, 2005, 2006, 2008, 2009, 2010, 2011).
 La historia de Manú (Santiago: Aguilar Chilena de Ediciones, 2004, 2005, 2006, 2007, 2010, 2011)
 Pero ahora no es verano (Santiago: Random House Mondadori, 2011).
 Un niño de diez mil años (Santiago: Empresa Editora Zig-Zag, 2011).
 Un esqueleto en vacaciones (Editorial Zig-Zag)
 Antologías diversas con apariciones de sus obras: "Historias de mentes". Ed. Alfaguara, 2001.
 "Contando el cuento: antología joven narrativa chilena" R. Díaz Eterovich y Diego Muñoz V. (comps). Ed Sinfronteras, 1986.
 "Grandes cuentos del siglo XX" Camilo Marks (comp.) Ed Sudamericana, 2001.

References

External links 
 Ana María del Río at Memoria Chilena.

Pontifical Catholic University of Chile alumni
Chilean feminists
20th-century Chilean novelists
21st-century Chilean novelists
Chilean academics
Chilean women novelists
1948 births
Living people
20th-century Chilean women writers
21st-century Chilean women writers